Hebersham is a suburb of Sydney, in the state of New South Wales, Australia. Hebersham is located 47 kilometres west of the Sydney central business district, in the local government area of the City of Blacktown and is part of the Greater Western Sydney region.

History 
Hebersham was coined to honor the Anglican Bishop Reginald Heber of Calcutta whose diocese included New South Wales. In 1829 the Trustees of the Clergy and Schools Lands in New South Wales planned to establish a village named Hebersham on the Western Highway, west of Eastern Creek. This never happened, but the name was used for this present day suburb.

Population
According to the 2016 census of Population, there were 5,685 people in Hebersham.
 Aboriginal and Torres Strait Islander people made up 6.4% of the population. 
 58.1% of people were born in Australia. The next most common countries of birth were Philippines 4.7%, Fiji 4.3%, New Zealand 4.3%, Pakistan 2.2% and England 1.9%.   
 59.2% of people spoke only English at home. Other languages spoken at home included Hindi 4.4%, Arabic 4.1%, Samoan 3.6%, Urdu 3.5% and Tagalog 3.3%. 
 The most common responses for religion were Catholic 26.7%, No Religion 17.7%, Anglican 11.7% and Islam 11.4%.

Education 
Hebersham is also home to Hebersham Public School, a primary school founded in 1972.

References 

Suburbs of Sydney
City of Blacktown